Alejandro "Álex" Pina Calafi (born 22 June 1967) is a Spanish television producer, writer, and director, known for the crime drama Money Heist. Previous shows include Vis a vis, El embarcadero, and Los hombres de Paco. His newest series, Sky Rojo, started filming in November 2019, while White Lines, a co-production for Netflix with The Crown team, first streamed on 15 May 2020. The Hollywood Reporter listed Pina in their "Top International Showrunners of 2019".

Biography 
Born in Pamplona in 1967, Pina began his career as a journalist in the press such as Diario Vasco and Diario de Mallorca and later in the Europa Press Agency.

Between 1993 and 1996, he worked as a scriptwriter and editor for Videomedia until he then joined Globomedia in 1996.

In 1997, at the same production company, he started his career as a screenwriter in the television series Más que amigos, from there, he began to play the roles of creator and executive producer in iconic Spanish series such as Los Serrano, Los hombres de Paco, and El barco.

At the end of 2016, after the launch of Vis a vis by Antena 3, Pina left Globomedia and founded Vancouver Media, his own production company. The first production was La Casa de Papel (Money Heist), which premiered on Antena 3 on 2 May 2017 with more than four million viewers. The series was distributed worldwide by Netflix and became the biggest success of his career, leading to the signing of an exclusive contract with the streaming platform for the creation and production of an original series. In 2020 Alex Pina produced White Lines.

Filmography

Television

References

External links
 
 

Living people
Spanish film directors
Spanish film producers
Spanish screenwriters
Spanish male writers
Spanish television directors
Spanish television producers
Spanish television writers
Spanish-language film directors
Male television writers
1967 births